= CanSupport =

- Founded: 1996
- Founder: Harmala Gupta
- Purpose: Palliative care
- Headquarters: New Delhi
- Location: 60/2D, Yusuf Sarai, Indian Oil Building Compound New Delhi-110016, India
- Coordinates: 28.558690258°N 77.208496032°E
- Region served: India
- Services: home care, day care, out-patient clinic
- CEO: Ambika Rajwanshi
- Website: www.cansupport.org

CanSupport is an organization based in India that supports cancer patients. They work in the field of palliative care in north India. They aim to serve people suffering from cancer through their programs -home care, outpatient clinics and day care centers.

== About the Founder ==
Harmala Gupta founded CanSupport in 1996 after her own battle with cancer. While working on her Ph.D. thesis in McGill University, Montreal, Canada, she was diagnosed with Hodgkin's lymphoma. Her experience with Hodgkin's lymphoma inspired her to establish CanSupport.

== Awards and recognition ==
- In 2017, CanSupport was declared a "Public Health Champion" by the World Health Organization, WHO.
- In 2015, CanSupport was awarded the Rashtriya Swayamsiddha Samman in the Inspirational Model Category in the field of healthcare. This National Award has been instituted by the JSPL Foundation, a non-profit CSR wing of Jindal Steel and Power Limited, to recognize exemplary grassroots NGOs in India.
